Paraccra (possibly from Aymara for a piece of land which is neither flat nor mountainous) is an archaeological site in the Andes of Peru on a mountain of the same name. It is situated in the Arequipa Region, Caylloma Province, Sibayo District, near the Colca River. The site contains towers, round houses and black walls.

References 

Mountains of Peru
Mountains of Arequipa Region
Archaeological sites in Peru
Archaeological sites in Arequipa Region